Ada Roon born Adelheid Schneider (4 May 1882 – 27 January 1953) was a German actress, screenwriter and film producer. She moved from acting to screen writing to producing films.

Life
Roon was born in Berlin with the name Adelheid Schneider. She had been working as a stage actress since her debut in 1902 at Berlin's Neue Theater under her birth name, both in Berlin and in the provinces (e.g. at the Deutsches Theater in Hannover). In Berlin she met the Austrian screenwriter and later director , whom she married on 16 October 1917 in Charlottenburg.

By his side and under the pseudonym Ada van Roon, she became a scriptwriter in 1919. In this capacity she wrote the manuscripts for numerous productions by Bock-Stieber. She also worked in her husband's production company. Their scripts included Paul Wegener's "World Without Weapons" which explored the idea of a weapon designed to defend and end war. The weapon is exploited and the message is that peace can only be achieved by consensus and cannot be imposed by technology.

Shortly after the onset of the sound film era, Ada van Roon retired from script writing and produced from 1931 with her own company Ada van Roon production cultural films. In 1934 she had to cease her cinematic activity.

Roon died in Neukölln in 1953.

Films
1920: The haunt of life
1920: The invisible thief
1920: The rays of death
1921: The man in the closet (film reel)
1923: Paddy, the Foundling or: The Battle of the Four
1923: Escape from life
1923: The prince of the highway
1923: The fool and the others
1924: The house in the dark
1924: People in the fog
1924: altitude fever
1925: The handwriting of the Inca
1925: The unknown opponent
1927: World Without Weapons
1931: A Storm Over Zakopane (written) created in German and Polish

Produced films
1931: Escape from everyday life
1932: Swimming artist
1932: The king of the animals and his clan
1933: ungulates
1933: water sports and water hiking
1933: May 1, 1933. The holiday of national labor
1933: German bells on the Rhine (also directing)
1934: In the spring of life

References

1882 births
1953 deaths
Film people from Berlin
German women screenwriters
20th-century German screenwriters